This is a list of sovereign states in the 1930s, giving an overview of states around the world during the period between 1 January 1930 and 31 December 1939. It contains entries, arranged alphabetically, with information on the status and recognition of their sovereignty. It includes widely recognized sovereign states, entities which were de facto sovereign but which were not widely recognized by other states, and 1 state which was initially unrecognized but then gained full recognition later in the decade.

Sovereign states

1930-1939
1930s politics-related lists